The 2003 Carlisle City Council election took place on 1 May 2003 to elect members of Carlisle District Council in Cumbria, England. One third of the council was up for election and the Conservative Party lost overall control of the council to no overall control.

After the election, the composition of the council was:
Conservative 24
Labour 22
Liberal Democrats 5
Independent 1

Election result
Overall turnout at the election was 31.4%, slightly down from the 31.7% in 2002.

Ward results

References

2003 English local elections
2003
2000s in Cumbria